George Ingersoll Wood (May 20, 1814 – January 9, 1899) was an American Congregationalist clergyman and a founding member of Yale's Skull and Bones Society.

Rev. George Ingersoll Wood was born in Stamford, Connecticut. He was the son of Hon. Joseph Wood and Frances Ellsworth, daughter of Supreme Court Chief Justice Oliver Ellsworth.

He graduated from Yale College in 1833 and the Union Theological Seminary in New York City in 1838.  While at Yale he was a founding member of The Skull and Bones Society. He and his wife Susan, married in 1840, had four children.

Wood was ordained in Washington, D.C., on May 18, 1840, and pastored the Second Presbyterian Church there for a year. He was then pastor in several of the Congregational churches of Connecticut: West Hartford (1842–1844), North Branford (1844–1850, 1855–1858), Ellington (1850–1854, 1869–1870), and Guilford (1858–1867). During these years he had repeated bronchial sickness that required him to take leave from his pulpit. Beginning in 1868, he took a year and a half of respite in St. Cloud, Minnesota, serving in the town's First Congregational church.

He died at age 84 in Washington, D.C.

Family
He married Susan Townsend Merwin, daughter of Rev. Samuel Merwin and Clarina B. Taylor, on 28 April 1840 at New Haven, Connecticut.

Children of Rev. George Ingersoll Wood and Susan Townsend Merwin:

 Emily Merwin Wood+ b. 11 Feb 1841, d. 18 May 1916
 Brig. Gen. Oliver Ellsworth Wood+ b. 6 Jun 1844, d. 4 Dec 1910
 George Ingersoll Wood b. 12 Feb 1850, d. 15 Apr 1877
 Joseph Wolcott Wood b. 12 Oct 1851, d. 3 May 1877

References

1814 births
1899 deaths
American clergy
Yale College alumni
Union Theological Seminary (New York City) alumni
People from Stamford, Connecticut
19th-century Congregationalist ministers
19th-century American clergy